The Journal of School Violence is a quarterly peer-reviewed scientific journal covering the study of school violence. It was established in 2002 and was originally published by Haworth Press, but is now published by Taylor & Francis' subsidiary Routledge. The editors-in-chief are Ryan W. Randa (Sam Houston State University) and Brad W. Reyns (Weber State University). According to the Journal Citation Reports, the journal has a 2016 impact factor of 2.421.

References

External links

Violence journals
Education journals
Routledge academic journals
English-language journals
Publications established in 2002
Quarterly journals
School violence